Sgabeo is a food typical of Lunigiana, an Italian historical region now divided between Liguria and Tuscany. This is leavened bread dough, cut into strips, fried and salted on the surface that is traditionally eaten plain or stuffed with cheese or cold cuts. Lately, however, it is not uncommon that the sgabeo is also proposed as a sweet, filled with pastry cream or chocolate.

Origins 
The recipe for sgabei originates in the Val di Magra, in the extreme east of Liguria, where women used to fry the dough left over from the production of bread in lard to create a sort of fried bread to accompany meats and cheeses. The bread dough was enriched with yellow flour which made it more crunchy and dry. Sgabei were prepared for the men who went to work in the fields and ate them at lunchtime.

Today they are offered above all on the occasion of village festivals or as an appetizer or second course in restaurants and kitchens in La Spezia and Lunigiana. The current shape is in strips of leavened dough with a width of about 3-4 cm and a length varying from 15 to 30 cm. Frying takes place in olive oil until the stool becomes warm and golden.

See also
 List of doughnut varieties
 List of fried dough varieties

References

External links
 

Italian breads
Doughnuts
Stuffed dishes